The 1950–51 season was the 71st season of competitive football by Rangers.

Overview
Rangers played a total of 38 competitive matches during the 1950–51 season.

Results
All results are written with Rangers' score first.

Scottish League Division A

Scottish Cup

League Cup

Appearances

See also
 1950–51 in Scottish football
 1950–51 Scottish Cup
 1950–51 Scottish League Cup

References 

Rangers F.C. seasons
Rangers